Grażyna Prokopek-Janáček (born 20 April 1977 in Zalewo) is a retired Polish sprinter who specialized in the 400 metres.

She is married to a Czech former pole vaulter, Štěpán Janáček.

International competitions

1Representing Europe

Personal bests

Outdoor
 100 metres – 11.67 (Bydgoszcz 1999)
 200 metres – 23.22 (Bydgoszcz 2004)
 400 metres – 51.29 (Athens 2004)
 800 metres – 2:08.31 (Suwałki 1999)

Indoor
 60 metres – 7.57 (Prague 2006)
 200 metres – 23.94 (Spała 2004)
 400 metres – 52.00 (Birmingham 2007)

See also
 Polish records in athletics

References

External links
 

1977 births
Living people
Polish female sprinters
Athletes (track and field) at the 2004 Summer Olympics
Athletes (track and field) at the 2008 Summer Olympics
Olympic athletes of Poland
People from Zalewo
European Athletics Championships medalists
Sportspeople from Warmian-Masurian Voivodeship
Universiade medalists in athletics (track and field)
Skra Warszawa athletes
Universiade silver medalists for Poland
Medalists at the 2005 Summer Universiade
People from Ostróda
Olympic female sprinters